Theater on Podil (officially: Kyiv Academic Drama Theater on Podil) is an academic drama theater in Kyiv, established in 1987 in historical Podil and directed by Ukrainian theater director Vitaliy Malakhov.

History 
In 1987, a theater was established on Podil in Kyiv. In 2006, it got a title "Academic drama theater".

In 2017, it was fully renovated and reopened. The theater has provoked much discussion and criticism because of its modernist architecture. Many citizens did not like the reconstruction of the building in the historical part of Kyiv, which caused outrage and protests.

At the same time, there were many defenders of the new theater building, who believed that the Podil area needed modern architecture and wondered why Kyivans did not accept modern art.

In 2018, the reconstruction project of the Podil Theater won the Grand Prix of the Ukrainian Urban Awards architectural competition and took the first prize in the Architecture of Cultural and Social Objects category.

In 2019, the restored building of the Theater in Podil was nominated for the European Architectural Award Mies van der Rohe Award 2019.

References 

Theatres in Kyiv